Average daily quantity (ADQ), is similar to the World Health Organizations defined daily dose, but adjusted to reflect how medication are use in England.

References

Health economics